Jogulamba temple is a Hindu temple dedicated to Goddess Jogulamba, a form of Shakti located in Alampur, Telangana, India. The temple is one of the Maha Shakti Peethas, a group of eighteen (Ashtadasa) temples considered the most significant shrines and pilgrimage destinations in Shaktism. Alampur is located on the banks of the Tungabhadra river near its confluence with Krishna river. Jogulamba temple is located in the same complex as that of the Navabrahma Temples, a group of nine Shiva temples built in the seventh-eighth century CE.

The principal deities at the Jogulamba temple are Jogulamba and Balabrahmeswara, a form of Shiva. In this temple Goddess Jogulamba is seen seated on a corpse with scorpion, frog, and lizard on the head. The word Jogulamba is said to be derived from the Telugu word Yogula Amma which means Mother of Yogis. In 2019, the temple was included under the PRASAD (Pilgrimage Rejuvenation Advancement Drive) scheme of the Government of India.

Location 
Alampur is located approximately 220 km south of Hyderabad and is accessible through Hyderabad-Bangalore highway. Jogulamba temple is located in the same complex as that of the Navabrahma Temples, a group of nine temples dedicated to Shiva built in the seventh and eighth century CE by the Badami Chalukyas.

History 

Jogulamba temple is regarded as a Shakti Peetha where Sati Devi's upper teeth fell. The mythology of Daksha yagna and Sati's self immolation is the origin story of Shakti Peethas. The original temple was reportedly built in seventh century CE. It was grounded by Bahmani Sultans in 1390 CE. Vijayanagara Emperor Harihara Raya II was said to have sent his army to fight the Bahamani Sultan's army and fortified the temple complex to stop further attacks. It was said that the main idol was shifted to the nearby Bala Brahma temple in the Navabrahma temple complex. Since then, the idol had been worshipped in a secluded place in the Bala Brahma temple. Jogulamba temple was rebuilt at its former location in 2005 and the original idol was installed in the new temple.

Gallery

References

Hindu temples in Telangana
Shakti Peethas
Shaktism